First Demo is a demo album from the post-hardcore band Fugazi released on November 18, 2014 through Dischord Records. It was recorded at Don Zientara's Inner Ear Studios in Arlington, VA and the Dischord House in 1988. It is the band's first studio release in over thirteen years, since the release of The Argument in October 2001. First Demo was released on LP, CD and Digital Download.

Writing and recording
First Demo was recorded in January 1988 with the band having only performed 10 shows together. The album features the 10 tracks from the original demo tape including "In Defense of Humans", which was released on 1989's State of the Union compilation as well as an additional track from the session, "Turn Off Your Guns", a song previously never released in its studio form and only available through the Fugazi Live Series.

Track listing

Personnel
 Ian MacKaye – vocals, guitar
 Guy Picciotto – backing vocals, lead vocals (track 7)
 Joe Lally – bass
 Brendan Canty – drums

Production
Fugazi - producer, recording, engineer, mixing
Don Zientara - producer, recording, engineer, mixing

References

2014 albums
Fugazi albums
Dischord Records albums
Art rock albums by American artists
Albums produced by Don Zientara
Albums produced by Ian MacKaye